Ålvundeid Church is a parish church of the Church of Norway in Sunndal Municipality in Møre og Romsdal county, Norway. It is located in the village of Ålvundeidet. It is the church for the Ålvundeid parish which is part of the Indre Nordmøre prosti (deanery) in the Diocese of Møre. The red, wooden church was built in an octagonal style in 1848 by the architect Ole Pedersen Tøfte. The church seats about 230 people.

History

The earliest existing historical records of a church in the Ålvund area date back to 1309, but the church was not new that year. The old church may have been a stave church that was built in the 13th century, but no physical description of the church exists. The old church was part of the Stangvik Church parish and served as an annex church for that parish. The old church was closed and torn down at some point, likely before 1589, and then for some time there was no church here.

In 1838, the new municipality of Øksendal was established and this area became part of that municipality and a part of the Øksendal Church parish. The people of the Ålvundeid area desired their own church so they didn't need to boat across a fjord to attend church services. On 31 March 1847, a royal decree approved the construction of a church in Ålvundeid. It was designed by Ole Pedersen Tøfte. It is an octagonal, wooden church with a tower on the centre of the nave. The church was consecrated on 1 November 1848. In 1865, the Ålvundeid area was split off as its own parish. In 1955, Roar Tønseth designed and built a sacristy and church porch were added to the east and west side of the building, respectively.

See also
List of churches in Møre

References

Sunndal
Churches in Møre og Romsdal
Wooden churches in Norway
Octagonal churches in Norway
19th-century Church of Norway church buildings
Churches completed in 1848
13th-century establishments in Norway
16th-century disestablishments in Norway
1848 establishments in Norway